The South Carolina Philharmonic is an orchestra based in Columbia, South Carolina, USA.  Performances are held at the Koger Center for the Arts in Columbia. The current concertmaster is Mary Lee Taylor Kinosian.  The orchestra was founded in 1963.

2007/8 season
The orchestra's 2007/2008 season consisted of seven performances from 22 September to 5 April. Seven guest conductors (candidates for the vacant position of music director) conducted the Philharmonic in concert.

 Steven Lipsitt (22 September 2007)
 Morihiko Nakahara (13 October 2007)
 Carolyn Kuan (11 November 2007)
 Sarah Hatsuko Hicks (19 January 2008)
 David Commanday (9 February 2008)
 Adam Flatt (15 March 2008)
 Miriam Burns (5 April 2008)

Music directors
Morihiko Nakahara (2008–)
Nicholas R.N. Smith (1993–2007)
Dr. Einar W. Anderson (1982–1993)
Dr. John Bauer (1980–1981)
Arpad Darazs (1971–1980)
Dr. Arthur M. Fraser (1964–1971)

External links 
Official site

Musical groups established in 1963
American orchestras
Culture of Columbia, South Carolina
Wikipedia requested audio of orchestras
Tourist attractions in Columbia, South Carolina
Performing arts in South Carolina
Musical groups from South Carolina

ja:ダラス交響楽団